Nymphicula conjunctalis is a moth in the family Crambidae. It was described by David John Lawrence Agassiz in 2014. It is found in Australia, where it has been recorded from the Northern Territory.

The wingspan is about 11 mm. The base of the forewing is ochreous with fuscous subbasal fascia and white antemedian fascia. The medial area is white, scaled with dark brown. The basal quarter of the hindwings is white. The antemedian band is orange-brown and there is a metallic tornal spot.

Etymology
The species name refers to the conjoined terminal eyespots of the hindwings.

References

Nymphicula
Moths described in 2014